Hygrophorus nemoreus is an edible species of fungus in the genus Hygrophorus.

External links

Fungi described in 1801
nemoreus
Taxa named by Christiaan Hendrik Persoon